Simon Schenk (16 May 1946 – 1 May 2020) was a Swiss politician.

Biography
Schenk served as a member of the National Council from 1994 to 2001, representing the Canton of Bern.

He was also the coach of the Switzerland men's national ice hockey team.

References

1946 births
2020 deaths
People from the canton of Bern
Swiss People's Party politicians
Members of the National Council (Switzerland)